Romy McCahill (born 7 November  1993) is a Scottish model and beauty pageant titleholder who was crowned as Miss Earth Scotland 2014 that gives her the right to represent Scotland at Miss Earth 2014. She was crowned by Miss Earth Scotland 2013, Kiera Kingsman. On 24 August 2017 she was crowned as Miss Scotland 2017 by Lucy Kerr Miss Scotland 2016 and represented her country at Miss World 2017.

Pageantry

Miss Earth Scotland 2014
Romy joined Miss Earth Scotland 2014. She won the pageant and succeeded Kiera Kingsman. Her elemental court includes Kira McLean as Miss Air, Amy Meisak as Miss Water and Emma McGrane as Miss Fire.

Miss Earth 2014
By winning Miss Earth Scotland, Romy flew to the Philippines in November to compete with almost 100 other candidates to be Alyz Henrich's successor as Miss Earth.

As the pageant concluded, Romy was able to penetrate the semifinal round as she was part of the Top 16 semifinalists. However, she was not able to move further. The pageant was won by Jamie Herrell of the Philippines.

Miss World 2017
Prior on winning Miss Scotland| Miss Scotland 2017, McCahill has the right to represent Scotland at Miss World 2017. Stephanie Del Valle of Puerto Rico will crown her successor at the end of the event.

References

1994 births
Living people
British beauty pageant winners
Miss Earth 2014 contestants
Miss World 2017 delegates
Scottish female models